The 2017–18 season was Kilmarnock's fifth season in the Premiership, and their 25th consecutive season in the top flight of Scotlish football.

Overview
Following a pre-season training camp in La Manga, Spain, Kilmarnock played one friendly before the season began against Livingston.

Kilmarnock were seeded for the group stage draw of the League Cup and were drawn to face rivals Ayr United along with Dumbarton, Clyde and Annan Athletic.

In their opening fixture, Kilmarnock lost their first Ayrshire derby for 18 years after Andy Geggan scored the only goal at Somerset Park. After the early setback, Kilmarnock recovered to finish second in Group E and qualified for the second round where they would play defending champions Celtic at Celtic Park. There was a question over whether Celtic should have been awarded a penalty after 13 minutes when Jonny Hayes appeared to dive in the box but it made little difference as they eased to a 5–0 win and knocked Kilmarnock out.

The Premiership season began on 5 August 2017 and is scheduled to conclude on 13 May 2018. Kilmarnock were originally scheduled to play their first away match on 12 August 2017 against Heart of Midlothian but the fixture was reversed due to the redevelopment of Tynecastle Stadium. Their first away game of the season was instead played on 9 September 2017 against Motherwell, their fifth league fixture. The rearranged Hearts tie, due to be played on 5 November 2017, was subsequently switched to Murrayfield Stadium because the redevelopment works had taken longer than initially scheduled.

Kilmarnock picked up their first point of the season in a 2–2 home draw with Hamilton Academical in their fourth game. The away side managed to hold Kilmarnock to a draw by scoring a last-minute penalty to come back from 2–0 down. Top scorer Kris Boyd picked up a hamstring injury during the match.

Kilmarnock's match against Hibernian on 21 October 2017 was postponed due to Hibernian's participation in the League Cup semi-finals and was rearranged to be played on 31 October 2017.

Following a 2–0 home defeat to Ross County, Kilmarnock parted company with manager Lee McCulloch on 1 October 2017. Kilmarnock had won none of their opening eight league matches scoring only five goals as they sat bottom of the table with just three points. On 14 October 2017 Kilmarnock announced that former West Bromwich Albion and Reading manager Steve Clarke would take over as manager from 16 October 2017. Academy director Paul McDonald took charge of the game against Partick Thistle on 14 October 2017.

With new manager Steve Clarke watching from the stand, Kilmarnock claimed their first league win of the season with a 2–0 victory at Firhill Stadium against fellow strugglers Partick Thistle. Top scorer Kris Boyd scored his first goal since August as Kilmarnock moved off the bottom of the league.

Clarke had to wait until 25 October for his first game in charge of the team at Ibrox Stadium against Rangers. The home side took the lead shortly before half time when Jason Holt scored. However, as Clark alluded to after the game, his side looked as if they deserved something from the game. In a dramatic final few minutes, Rangers were awarded a penalty before Ryan Jack was sent off for Rangers on 93 minutes. Daniel Candeias stepped up but his effort was saved by Killie keeper Jamie MacDonald and Kilmarnock broke up the other end with former Rangers midfielder Chris Burke netting the equaliser.

Just three days later, Clarke's side recorded another creditable draw in Glasgow after Jordan Jones scored a 60th-minute equaliser against Celtic at Celtic Park.

Clarke's first home game in charge saw Killie take on Hibernian on Halloween. The scoreline may suggest a Halloween horror show for Clarke's men but the home side were extremely unlucky - creating 16 scoring opportunities in the match - as a clinical Hibs recorded a 3–0 win.

Murrayfield Stadium was the scene for Clarke's first win in charge against Hearts on 5 November 2017. Kris Boyd had given Killie a 1–0 half-time lead before Esmaël Gonçalves equalised with 14 minutes to go. Adam Frizzell scored his second goal of the season 10 minutes later as Killie earned a 2–1 win.

Kilmarnock had to wait until 9 December 2017 for their first home league win of the season against Partick Thistle. Chris Erskine had cancelled out Kris Boyd's opener before Killie ran riot with Eamonn Brophy scoring twice, Boyd getting his second and an unfortunate own goal from Niall Keown earning them a 5–1 win as they moved up to eighth in the Premiership. It was the first time Kilmarnock had scored five goals in a league game since a 5–1 SPL win against Dunfermline Athletic in December 2006, 11 years ago.

Clarke's Kilmarnock continued to break records as they picked up their 13th point in five games with a first win over Rangers at Rugby Park since 2011 and a third consecutive home win for the first time in three years. Kris Boyd scored his 10th and 11th goals of the season as Killie came from behind to earn a deserved 2–1 win against the Glasgow side. The three points saw Kilmarnock spend Christmas in the top six as they moved up two places to sixth in the table.

Killie's Premiership match with Hamilton Academical on 27 December 2017 was postponed after the pitch at New Douglas Park failed a second inspection. Hamilton claimed that the match was "swept away by nature" after snow - which had been left on the pitch overnight - had frozen leaving the artificial surface unplayable.

Hibernian were the opponents for Killie's last match of 2017 and their last match ahead of the three-week winter break. A Kris Boyd goal earned Kilmarnock a 1–1 draw at Easter Road as they extended their unbeaten away run to nine matches and ended December unbeaten with four wins and two draws. The point moved Kilmarnock back above St Johnstone as they ended the year in the top six. On Monday 15 January 2018, Clarke was named Premiership manager of the month for December with Kris Boyd named player of the month after scoring six goals in December.

Kilmarnock were due to play St Johnstone on 24 January 2018 at Rugby Park but the match was postponed after the Perth Saints' Scottish Cup match with Albion Rovers was postponed due to a frozen pitch at Cliftonhill and subsequently rearranged to be played on 23 January 2018. The match against Dundee on 31 January 2018 suffered a similar fate after it was postponed due to the clash Dundee's Scottish Cup fourth round replay against Inverness Caledonian Thistle on the same day.

Kilmarnock entered the fourth round of Scottish Cup as one of the Premiership clubs, starting on 20 January 2018. The draw for the fourth round was made on Monday, 20 November 2017 and Kilmarnock were drawn at home to fellow Premiership side Ross County. Lee Erwin scored the only goal of the game from the penalty spot after Tim Chow was sent off late on.

The fifth round draw was made on 21 January 2018 and Kilmarnock were drawn at home to Highland League side Brora Rangers. The two teams had never played against each other before and Brora made it tough for Kilmarnock but the Premiership side ran out 4–0 winners.

The draw for the quarter-finals was made on 11 February 2018 and Kilmarnock were drawn away to fellow Premiership side Aberdeen. After conceding an early goal at Pittodrie Stadium, Killie battled back and earned a replay at Rugby Park thanks to a Kris Boyd penalty.

Kilmarnock's cup run came to an end in the replay at Rugby Park. The 90 minutes ended in a stalemate and, with a place in the semi-finals against Motherwell awaiting the winner, Stephen O'Donnell gave the home side the lead six minutes into extra-time. Aberdeen equalised through a Kenny McLean penalty before Eamonn Brophy had a goal controversially disallowed for offside. In the penalty shoot-out, former Killie keeper Freddie Woodman saved three penalties to see Aberdeen through 3–2.

Match results

Pre-season and friendlies

Premiership

Scottish Cup

League Cup

Group stage

Knock-out phase

Club statistics

Competition Overview

League table

Squad statistics

Source:

Player transfers

Transfers in

Transfers out

Notes

References

Kilmarnock F.C. seasons
Kilmarnock